Siiri Johanna "Äitee" Rantanen ( Lintunen, born 14 December 1924) is a Finnish retired cross-country skier. She competed in the 1952, 1956 and 1960 Olympics and won a medal in each of them: a gold and a bronze in the 3 × 5 km relay in 1956–60 and another bronze in the individual 10 km in 1952; she placed fifth and 15th over 10 km in 1956 and 1960, respectively. She also won five medals at the FIS Nordic World Ski Championships.

Domestically Rantanen won six individual (10 km in 1954 and 1957–58; 5 km in 1960–1962) and five relay titles (1952, 1958–1961). Rantanen also won three Finnish titles in athletics: one individual in cross-country running in 1960 and two in 1961, in the 3 × 800 m relay and team cross-country; the same year she also became the Finnish champion in the 50 km cycling road race. She was selected as the Finnish female athlete of the year in 1954, 1956, 1958, and 1959. Rantanen worked as an upholsterer and continued competing in sports until her 80s.

Cross-country skiing results
All results are sourced from the International Ski Federation (FIS).

Olympic Games
3 medals – (1 gold, 2 bronze)

World Championships
 5 medals – (3 silver, 2 bronze)

References

External links

 
 

1924 births
Living people
People from Tohmajärvi
Finnish amputees
Finnish female cross-country skiers
Olympic cross-country skiers of Finland
Cross-country skiers at the 1952 Winter Olympics
Cross-country skiers at the 1956 Winter Olympics
Cross-country skiers at the 1960 Winter Olympics
Olympic gold medalists for Finland
Olympic bronze medalists for Finland
Olympic medalists in cross-country skiing
FIS Nordic World Ski Championships medalists in cross-country skiing
Medalists at the 1952 Winter Olympics
Medalists at the 1956 Winter Olympics
Medalists at the 1960 Winter Olympics
Sportspeople from North Karelia